Alexandra Grande (born 5 February 1990) is a Peruvian karateka. She is a two-time gold medalist in the women's 61 kg event at the Pan American Games. She also won bronze in this event at the 2021 World Karate Championships in Dubai, United Arab Emirates. In 2021, she represented Peru at the 2020 Summer Olympics in Tokyo, Japan. She competed in the women's 61 kg event.

Career 

She won the bronze medal in the women's 61 kg event at the 2010 World Combat Games held in Beijing, China. She represented Peru at the 2017 World Games held in Wrocław, Poland and she won the gold medal in the women's kumite 61 kg event.

In 2018, she won the silver medal in the women's kumite 61 kg event at the South American Games held in Cochabamba, Bolivia after a defeat in the final against Jacqueline Factos of Ecuador.

She won the gold medal in the women's kumite 61 kg event at the 2019 Pan American Games held in Lima, Peru. Four years earlier, she also won the gold medal in the women's kumite 61 kg event at the 2015 Pan American Games. In 2011, she won the silver medal in the same event at the Pan American Games in Guadalajara, Mexico.

In June 2021, she competed at the World Olympic Qualification Tournament held in Paris, France hoping to qualify for the 2020 Summer Olympics in Tokyo, Japan. She was eliminated in her first match by Lynn Snel of the Netherlands. As a result, she did not qualify at this tournament but she was able to qualify via continental representation soon after. She competed in the women's 61 kg event. She was also the flag bearer for Peru during the closing ceremony. In November 2021, she won one of the bronze medals in the women's 61 kg event at the World Karate Championships held in Dubai, United Arab Emirates. In her bronze medal match she defeated Ingrida Suchánková of Slovakia.

She won the silver medal in the women's 61 kg event at the 2022 World Games held in Birmingham, United States. In the final, she faced the same opponent as in her final match at the 2017 World Games.

She won the gold medal in her event at the 2022 South American Games held in Asunción, Paraguay.

Achievements

References

External links 

 

Living people
1990 births
Place of birth missing (living people)
Peruvian female karateka
Pan American Games medalists in karate
Pan American Games gold medalists for Peru
Pan American Games silver medalists for Peru
Medalists at the 2011 Pan American Games
Medalists at the 2015 Pan American Games
Medalists at the 2019 Pan American Games
Karateka at the 2011 Pan American Games
Karateka at the 2015 Pan American Games
Karateka at the 2019 Pan American Games
South American Games medalists in karate
South American Games gold medalists for Peru
South American Games silver medalists for Peru
Competitors at the 2010 South American Games
Competitors at the 2018 South American Games
Competitors at the 2022 South American Games
Competitors at the 2017 World Games
Competitors at the 2022 World Games
World Games gold medalists
World Games silver medalists
World Games medalists in karate
Karateka at the 2020 Summer Olympics
Olympic karateka of Peru
21st-century Peruvian women